Asati (असाटी in Hindi) is a merchant community in Bundelkhand region of Madhya Pradesh.

It is said that the Asatis originally hailed from a village near Ayodhya in Uttar Pradesh and later shifted to around Damoh in Madhya Pradesh. They subsequently migrated throughout the Bundelkhand region.

History
In some texts the name is given as Asahati or Asaiti.

Navalshah Chanderia, who wrote Vardhamana Purana in 1768 AD at Khataura, included the Asati community among the eleven merchant communities that are partly Jain.  Russel and Hiralal in 1916 also mention a minority being Jain.
Brahmachari Sitalprasad, in his introduction to an edition of the Mamala Pahuda (Taranpanthi Jain text) wrote that one of his used manuscripts was copied in an Asahati temple in 1624. The Taran Panth is followed by members of six communities in Bundelkhand, Asati being one of them.

Distribution

The census of India, 1891, reported 3,071 Asatis in the British ruled districts, of which 450 were Jains. They were mainly present in Jabalpur, Damoh and Sagar, where a significant fraction (27% in Jabalpur) were Jains.  Smaller number were present in Bhandara, Gondia, Nagpur and Chhindwara, where all of them were Vaishnava.

The community celebrates an annual Asati Diwas.

Notable figures
Ganeshprasad Varni, one of the foundational figures of the modern North-Indian Digambar intellectual tradition during early 20th century was born into an Asati family.

See also
Gahoi
Golapurva

References

Social groups of India
Indian castes
Social groups of Madhya Pradesh
Bania communities
Bundelkhand